is a fictional monster, or kaiju, which first appeared in the 1958 film Varan the Unbelievable, directed by Ishirō Honda and produced and distributed by Toho. Varan is depicted as a giant prehistoric reptile capable of gliding flight, and would go on to appear in the 1968 film Destroy All Monsters, the ninth film in the Godzilla franchise.

Overview
In its film debut, Varan is depicted as a kaiju that lives in a saltwater lake within the Kunishiroshima valley, where it is known to the natives as the god Baradagi-Sanjin and identified by an entomologist as a "Varanopode", a fictional reptile said to have lived during the Mesozoic Era. Varan kills an expedition duo and destroys a nearby village before attacking Tokyo until it is tricked by the military into eating bombs. After several of them detonate in its stomach, Varan is mortally wounded and escapes into the ocean, where the final bomb explodes and destroys it.

Varan reappears in the film Destroy All Monsters, living on Monsterland alongside several of Earth's monsters until the alien Kilaaks enslave the monsters and send them to attack Earth's major cities. After an astronaut crew destroys the aliens' control device, the Kilaaks respond by sending King Ghidorah to kill Earth's monsters. While most of them fight and eventually kill the space dragon, Varan did not take part in either. Following this, Earth's monsters return to Monsterland to live in peace.

Appearance and abilities
Eiji Tsuburaya and Akira Watanabe based Varan's design on that of a Draco lizard, Godzilla, and a kappa. The name Varan is derived from Varanus pater, or "father of lizards." The original incarnation of Varan is 50 meters (164 feet) tall and weighs 15,000 metric tons (16,534 short tons).

In its film appearances, Varan displays the ability to glide at speeds of Mach 1.5.

Action figures
Few figures of Varan have been issued, compared to the other kaiju film monsters. Bullmark released the first ever Varan vinyl toy in 1970. Bandai had initially only issued Varan in gashapon form as part of High Grade Series 6, in promotion for the film Godzilla 2000. However, in 2022 Bandai introduced a 6” Varan vinyl figure in their ‘Movie Monsters’ range, in response to a poll decided by fans as to which Toho characters needed figure releases. Y-MSF has also released a figure on the 6" scale in 2005. Other companies, such as CCP, Marmit, Trendmasters, and the modern version of Marusan have also released Varan figures.

Appearances
In one of the early drafts of what would become the film Godzilla vs. Gigan, Varan was to have joined Godzilla and Rodan in defending the Earth against King Ghidorah, Gigan, and a new monster called "Mogu". Additionally, Shusuke Kaneko, director of the Heisei Gamera trilogy had originally considered Varan to star in what would become the film Godzilla, Mothra and King Ghidorah: Giant Monsters All-Out Attack as one of Godzilla's opponents. However, the monster was replaced with the more popular King Ghidorah. The suit designer, Fuyuki Shinada, is said to have compromised by giving some of Varan's facial features to King Ghidorah.

Films
 Varan the Unbelievable (1958)
 Destroy All Monsters (1968)

Video games
 Godzilla: Monster of Monsters (NES - 1988)
 Kaijū-ō Godzilla / King of the Monsters, Godzilla (Game Boy - 1993)
 Godzilla Trading Battle (PlayStation - 1998)
 Godzilla: Unleashed (Wii - 2007)

Literature
 Godzilla 2000 (novel - 1997) 
 Godzilla: Rulers of Earth (comic - 2013-2015)
 Godzilla in Hell (comic - 2015)
 Godzilla: Monster Apocalypse (novel - 2017)

References

External links
 

Toho monsters
Fictional lizards
Fictional characters with superhuman strength
Godzilla characters
Kaiju
Mothra characters
Science fiction film characters
Fantasy film characters
Film characters introduced in 1958
Fictional monsters
Horror film villains